Who Killed Cock Robin? may refer to:

"Cock Robin", a nursery rhyme
"Who Killed Cock Robin?" (Randall and Hopkirk Deceased), an episode of the British television series Randall and Hopkirk (Deceased)
Who Killed Cock Robin? (1935 film), a 1935 animated short film in the Silly Symphonies series
Who Killed Cock Robin?, a 2005 independent film set in Butte, Montana
Who Killed Cock Robin? (soundtrack), the soundtrack to the 2005 film
Who Killed Cock Robin, the first chapter of the Japanese manga series Deadman Wonderland by Jinsei Kataoka and Kazuma Kondou.
Who Killed Cock Robin (film), a 2017 Taiwanese film
The main premise of Donna Tartt's 2nd novel The Little Friend (2002)
Who Killed Cock Robin ?, 17th Episode of "Midsomer Murders", a British television detective drama, (4th Series, 4th Episode), List of Midsomer Murders episodes#Series 4 (2000–2001), first aired 9 September 2001.

See also
Cock Robin (band), an American pop rock group